This is an alphabetical list of buildings, facilities and other structures at Ohio State University, a public research university in Columbus, Ohio.

Current buildings and facilities

Former buildings and facilities

Notes

References 

 
 

Ohio State
Ohio State University
Buildings and structures in Columbus, Ohio
Columbus, Ohio-related lists
Ohio State